"One Minute Past Eternity" is a song written by William E. Taylor and Stanley Kesler, and performed by Jerry Lee Lewis. It was released in November 1969 as the second and final single from the album, The Golden Cream of the Country. The song peaked at number 2 on both the U.S. Billboard Hot Country Singles chart and the Canadian RPM Country Tracks chart.

Chart performance

References

1969 singles
Jerry Lee Lewis songs
Sun Records singles
1969 songs